Moran Independent School District is a public school district based in Moran, Texas (USA).

Located in Shackelford County, small portions of the district extend into Callahan and Stephens counties.

Moran ISD has one school that serves students in grades pre-kindergarten through twelve.

History
The district changed to a four day school week in fall 2022.

Academic achievement
In 2009, the school district was rated "academically acceptable" by the Texas Education Agency.

Special programs

Athletics
Moran High School plays six-man football.

See also

List of school districts in Texas 
List of high schools in Texas

References

External links
Moran ISD

School districts in Shackelford County, Texas
School districts in Callahan County, Texas
School districts in Stephens County, Texas